Gastón Comas (born 13 June 1998) is an Argentine professional footballer who plays as a midfielder for Güemes, on loan from Unión Santa Fe.

Career
Comas began his career with Unión Santa Fe, having advanced through their youth set-up. Leonardo Madelón promoted him into the club's senior side in 2019, with his first taste of competitive action coming in April as he was an unused substitute for a Copa de la Superliga encounter with San Martín. Comas was on the bench two further times in the Primera División to start 2019–20, prior to making his professional bow on 31 August 2019 during a defeat away to San Lorenzo; playing all but the last seventeen minutes, when he was substituted for fellow debutant Juan Ignacio Nardoni. In February 2022, Comas joined Primera Nacional club Güemes on a loan deal for the rest of 2022.

Career statistics
.

References

External links

1998 births
Living people
People from Paraná, Entre Ríos
Argentine footballers
Association football midfielders
Argentine Primera División players
Primera Nacional players
Unión de Santa Fe footballers
Sportspeople from Entre Ríos Province